Achille Depauw (13 September 1885 – 5 March 1966) was a Belgian racing cyclist. He rode in the 1923 Tour de France.

References

1885 births
1966 deaths
Belgian male cyclists
Place of birth missing